The 2017 Big Ten men's basketball tournament was the postseason men's basketball tournament for the Big Ten Conference held from March 8 through March 12, 2017 at the Verizon Center in Washington, D.C. It was the first Big Ten men's basketball tournament held outside the conference's traditional heartland in the Midwest. The championship was won by Michigan, which defeated Wisconsin in the championship game. As a result, Michigan received the conference's automatic bid to the NCAA Tournament. The championship was Michigan's first (after having their win of the inaugural tournament vacated) and they became the lowest-seeded team ever to win the Big Ten tournament.

Seeds
All 14 Big Ten schools participated in the tournament. Teams were seeded by conference record, with a tiebreaker system used to seed teams with identical conference records. The top 10 teams received a first round bye and the top four teams received a double bye. Tiebreaking procedures remained unchanged from the 2016 tournament.

Schedule

Game summaries

First round

Second round

Quarterfinals

Semifinals

Championship

Bracket

* denotes overtime period

All-Tournament Team
Derrick Walton, Michigan – Big Ten tournament Most Outstanding Player
Zak Irvin, Michigan
Ethan Happ, Wisconsin
Nigel Hayes, Wisconsin
Bronson Koenig, Wisconsin

References

External links
2017 Big Ten Men's Basketball Tournament at BigTen.org

Big Ten men's basketball tournament
Tournament
Big Ten Conference men's basketball tournament
Big Ten men's basketball tournament